The 1974 World Rally Championship was the second season of the Fédération Internationale de l'Automobile (FIA) World Rally Championship (WRC). Due to the worldwide oil crisis, it was significantly reduced from its inaugural season, consisting of 8 events versus the previous 13 events. Notably absent were the Monte Carlo and Swedish rallies, though these would return the next year and remain part of the series to this day. However, other rallies such as those in Poland and Austria would never return to the WRC calendar. 1974 was the only year the WRC held two events in North America, though it would mark the last year for both of these events on the world stage.

Alpine-Renault proved unable to repeat its dominance from the previous year, with Italian manufacturers Lancia and Fiat vying for the title through the year. Fiat's Abarth 124 gained an early lead with a win at Monte Carlo, but fell to a strong performance by Lancia's Stratos HF which won three rallies, placing second again. Lancia's championship was the first of three consecutive WRC titles it would win through 1976 as well as the first of its record ten WRC manufacturer's championships. The Ford Escort was able to win a pair of rallies, repeating Ford's third-place finish of the previous year.

From 1973 to 1978, the WRC only awarded a season championship for the winning manufacturer. Scoring was given for the highest placing entry for each manufacturer. Thus if a particular manufacturer was to place 2nd, 4th, and 10th, they would receive points for 2nd place only. However, the manufacturer would still gain an advantage in scoring from its other entries, as the points for the 4th and 10th place entries would be denied to other manufacturers.

Calendar

With the oil crisis, the WRC Calendar was reduced from 13 to just 8. Morocco, Poland and Austria where dropped, while Monte-Carlo, Sweden and Acropolis were planned but finally canceled. The only debut was the Canadian Rally Rideau Lakes.

Manufacturers' championship

Events

See also 
 1974 in sports

External links
 FIA World Rally Championship 1974 at ewrc-results.com

 
World Rally Championship
World Rally Championship seasons